Raluca Elena Băcăoanu (born 2 May 1989) is a Romanian handballer for Gloria Bistrița and the Romanian national team.

Achievements  
Liga Națională:
Winner: 2019
Supercupa României:
Winner: 2018

References

External links

1989 births
Living people
Romanian female handball players
Sportspeople from Constanța
SCM Râmnicu Vâlcea (handball) players